Edmund Campion (born 1933 in Sydney) is an Australian Catholic priest and historian.

He was educated at Saint Ignatius' College, Riverview and the University of Sydney, where he was editor of the student newspaper Honi Soit in 1953. He completed a Master of Arts at the University of Cambridge and theological studies at the Catholic Institute of Sydney. He was ordained a priest in 1961 and after curacies at several Sydney parishes including St Mary's Cathedral was appointed a lecturer in history at the Catholic Institute of Sydney, later becoming Professor of History there.

He spoke against Australian involvement in the Vietnam War and in the 1970s was active in residents' action groups in Woolloomooloo.

His books on Australian Catholic History combine a personal point of view with discussions of the wider social context and the impact of Australian Catholics in many fields.

Campion was chairman of the judging panel for the inaugural Pascall Prize for Australian Critic of the Year in 1988. He was awarded an honorary doctorate of letters by the University of Sydney in 2005.

Books
 1980, John Henry Newman: Friends, allies, bishops, Catholics, Melbourne: Dove Communications, 
 1982, Rockchoppers: Growing up Catholic in Australia, Ringwood, Vic: Penguin, ;
 1987, Australian Catholics, Ringwood, Vic: Viking, 
 1994, A Place in the City, Ringwood, Vic: Penguin, 
 1996 (edited), Catholic Voices: Best Australian Catholic writing, Melbourne: David Lovell Publishing, 
 1997, Great Australian Catholics, Ringwood, Vic: David Lovell Publishing, ;
 2003, Lines of My Life: Journal of a year, Camberwell, Vic: Penguin, ;
 2009, Ted Kennedy: priest of Redfern, Kew East: David Lovell Publishing, 
 2014, Australian Catholic Lives, Kew East, Vic: David Lovell Publishing, 
 2016, Swifty: A life of Yvonne Swift, Sydney: NewSouth Publishing, 
 2021, Then and Now: Australian Catholic experiences, Adelaide: ATF Press,

References

1933 births
Living people
People educated at Saint Ignatius' College, Riverview
Australian historians
Australian Roman Catholic priests
University of Sydney alumni